The 1954 Isle of Man Tourist Trophy was the second race in the 1954 Grand Prix motorcycle racing season and proved highly controversial for TT Course and race changes. The 1954 Junior TT was the first race where the official race distance was reduced from 7 laps to 5 laps.  The 1954 Senior TT Race was stopped at half distance due to the weather conditions on the Mountain Section of the course.

The first world championship event for the 1954 Isle of Man TT Races was the 350cc Junior TT Race. The race was led on lap 1 by Fergus Anderson from Gilera team-mate Ken Kavanagh by 10 seconds and Ray Amm riding for Norton a further 6 seconds adrift in 3rd place. On lap 2, Fergus Anderson retired at Kirk Michael with an engine problem and Ken Kavanagh retired at the pits with an engine mis-fire on lap 3. The race was then led by Ray Amm by 24 seconds from Rod Coleman riding for AJS motor-cycles. However, Ray Amm retired at Barregarrow on lap 5 allowing Rod Coleman to become the first New Zealander to win an Isle of Man TT Race at an average race speed of 91.54 mph.

The new 10 lap (107.90 miles) Sidecar TT held on the Clypse Course was led from start to finish by Eric Oliver and passenger Les Nutt riding a Norton outfit with a "dust-bin" fairing at an average speed of 68.87 mph. The Norton outfit of Bill Boddice/J.Pirie hit a bank at Creg-ny-Baa and flipped over on lap 7, but continued on to finish the race in 6th place. The winner of the 1954 Lightweight TT race, Werner Haas crashed at Governor's Bridge on lap 1 of the 1954 Ultra-Lightweight TT Race, also held on the Clypse Course. This allowed Rupert Hollaus to win the race in 1 hour, 33 minutes and 3.4 seconds at an average race speed of 69.57 mph. His victory was notable because he was one of only seven riders to have won an Isle of Man TT race in their first attempt. 

In deteriorating weather conditions and with reduced visibility on the Mountain Section of the course the 1954 Senior TT Race was held after a short delay and started at midday. Despite the conditions, Geoff Duke riding the works Gilera set a time of 25 minutes and 41.0 seconds an average speed of 88.18 mph and led Ray Amm riding for Norton by 14 seconds on lap 1. On the second lap, Geoff Duke lapped in 26 minutes and 23 seconds at an average speed of 85.84 mph and Ray Amm lapped at an average speed of 86.49 to reduce the lead to just 2 seconds. Further heavy rain and low cloud on the Mountain Section reduced speed further and the conditions caused John Grace and Ted Frend to retire at the TT Grandstand on lap 2 and Ray Amm used "feet-down" tactics on the slower corners. The leader, Geoff Duke, decided to refuel on lap 3. Ray Amm in second place went straight through without stopping and lapped in 25 minutes and 28 seconds at an average speed of 88.93 mph and now led Geoff Duke by 32 seconds. At the Windy Corner on lap 4, the visibility was down to 20 yards and a decision was made to stop the race because of the conditions. This allowed Ray Amm, due to refueling at the TT Grandstand on lap 4, to win the 1954 Senior TT Race in 1 hour, 42 minutes and 46.8 seconds at an average race speed of 88.12 mph. The controversial decision by race organisers to stop the 1954 Senior TT Race on lap 4, just as the weather started to improve, was protested by the Gilera management. This was on the grounds that the works Norton team were told of the decision allowing Ray Amm to lead the race on lap 3, but the official protest was rejected by the race organisers. During lap 1 of the 1954 Senior TT Race, Simon Sandys-Winsch riding a Junior Velocette crashed at the Highlander and died in hospital a few days later.

Race results

1954 Clubmans Senior Results
10 June 1954 – Mountain Course (4 laps – 150.92 miles)

1954 Clubmans Junior Results
10 June 1954 – Mountain Course (4 laps – 150.92 miles)

1954 Isle of Man Junior TT 350cc final standings
14 June 1954  –  5 Laps (188.56 Miles) Mountain Course.

1954 Isle of Man Lightweight TT 250cc final standings
14 June 1954  –  3 Laps (113.00 Miles) Mountain Course.

1954 Isle of Man Ultra-Lightweight TT 125cc final standings
16 June 1954 – 10 Laps (107.90 miles) Clypse Course.

1954 Sidecar TT final standings
16 June 1954 – 10 Laps (107.90 miles) Clypse Course.

1954 Isle of Man Senior TT 500cc final standings
Friday 18 June 1954  –  4 Laps (150.74 Miles) Mountain Course. (Reduced Race Distance)

Notes
 The 1954 World Championship season was used to reintroduce the Ultra-Lightweight TT and Sidecar TT Race to the Isle of Man TT Races.  A new race circuit, the Clypse Course, was used for the new races.
 To facilitate racing on the Clypse Course, during the winter of 1953/54 road widening occurred on the Snaefell mountain course at Creg-ny-Baa, Signpost Corner, Cronk-ny-Mona and the approach to Governor's Bridge.  Other major course alterations for the 1954 Isle of Man TT Races included the removal of a cottage at Appledene, road widening at Handley's Corner, Barregarrow, Ballaugh Bridge and Kerrowmoar.
 The course alterations were criticised by leading TT competitor Ray Amm, who described the situation as a "Lot of trash to say the machines are beyond control..." and "To keep altering the course like this which has been going for 50 years is pure sacrilege they are wrecking it....It will finish-up like a racing bowl with all the character gone."
 The reintroduction of the Sidecar TT Race was controversial and the motorcycle manufacturers "declare themselves as appalled" by the inclusion of a sidecar race. It was also opposed by the motorcycle manufacturers for the inclusion of the first female competitor, Inge Stol at an Isle of Man TT race.  The matter of female competitors was raised in the Isle of Man Parliament, but "Tynwald refused to ban the Fräulein."
 A first-time visitor to the Isle of Man TT Races was Soichiro Honda the founder of Honda Motor Co., Ltd. (In 1959, a works Honda team arrived to compete in the TT for the first time).
 A number of accidents occurred during practice week. During Monday evening practice, R.J.Ashford riding an AJS was killed instantly after crashing at Laurel Bank. At Sarah's Cottage, during Wednesday evening practice, Bob McIntyre riding an AJS suffered a cut chin and concussion after a crash and was detained in Noble's Hospital. Also, Keith Campbell suffered a broken right foot and Bob Cooper a broken collar bone at incidents at Sarah's Cottage, both riding AJS motor-cycles in the Junior class.  
 On Lap 1 of the Junior race, Jack Brett riding for Norton retired at Ramsey with an engine problem.  At Sulby, Bob McIntyre, riding an AJS, retired with an engine problem. Riding a Norton, Maurice Quincey pushed in from Governor's Bridge and retired.
 At the Quarterbridge on lap 1 of the Senior TT, Derek Farrant riding for AJS crashed along with E. Houseley also riding an AJS. On lap 2, Fergus Anderson riding for Moto Guzzi retired at Barregarrow after falling off. At the Stonebreakers Hut the Norton of E.W.L.Hunt hit the bank and he retired.

Sources

External links
 Detailed race results
 Isle of Man TT winners
 Mountain Course map

Isle of Man Tt
Tourist Trophy
Isle of Man TT
Isle of Man TT